IC 4703 is the diffuse emission nebula or HII region associated with Messier 16, which is actually a cluster of stars. It is the nebulous region surrounding Messier 16. These two objects make up the Eagle Nebula. They are relatively bright and are located in the constellation Serpens Cauda. This region contains the picturesque Pillars of Creation.  This is an active star forming region 7,000 light years away. It is approximately magnitude 8. The cluster was discovered by Jean-Philippe Loys de Cheseaux, but Charles Messier later rediscovered it and remarked on its apparent nebulous appearance. The cluster is estimated to be 5.5 million years old, and the nebula would be a bit older. The nebula is about 55 x 70 light years. The Eagle Nebula lies in the Sagittarius Arm of the Milky Way.

References
The Belt of Venus. M16 and IC 4703 - The Eagle Nebula. 9/12/07. The Belt of Venus

See also
Messier 16
Eagle Nebula

4703
H II regions
Carina–Sagittarius Arm

Serpens (constellation)